Group JK corynebacterium sepsis is a form of  sepsis which occurs when the bacterium Corynebacterium jeikeium colonizes the skin of healthy individuals and gains access to a person's blood stream.

See also 
 Skin lesion

References 

Bacterium-related cutaneous conditions